Andrej Kadlec (born 2 February 1996) is a Slovak professional footballer who plays as a right back for Bruk-Bet Termalica Nieciecza.

Club career
He made his Fortuna Liga debut for Žilina on 26 April 2014 against Spartak Trnava, entering in as a substitute.

Honours 
Spartak Trnava
 Fortuna Liga: 2017–18

References

External links
 
 Andrej Kadlec at Eurofotbal
 
 Andrej Kadlec at Futbalnet
 Andrej Kadlec at UEFA

1996 births
Living people
People from Ilava
Sportspeople from the Trenčín Region
Association football defenders
Slovak footballers
Slovakia youth international footballers
Slovakia under-21 international footballers
MŠK Žilina players
FC Spartak Trnava players
Jagiellonia Białystok players
ŠKF Sereď players
MTK Budapest FC players
Bruk-Bet Termalica Nieciecza players
Slovak Super Liga players
Ekstraklasa players
Nemzeti Bajnokság I players
Expatriate footballers in Poland
Slovak expatriate sportspeople in Poland
Expatriate footballers in Hungary
Slovak expatriate sportspeople in Hungary